Skylar Tibbits is an American designer and computer scientist known for his work on self-assembly and 4d printing.

Education 
Skylar Tibbits graduated from Philadelphia University with a Bachelor of Architecture and received a Master of Science in Computer Science as well as a Master of Science in Design and Computation from MIT.

Career 
Tibbits’ work has been exhibited at the Solomon R. Guggenheim Museum in New York, the Frac Center’s 2014 Archilab Exhibition, and the 2008 Beijing Biennale.
Tibbits also co-curated the 2007 ScriptedbyPurpose exhibition in Philadelphia with Marc Fornes.

He currently teaches at the Massachusetts Institute of Technology, Department of Architecture where he has founded the Self-Assembly Laboratory. Tibbits is also the founder of SJET (a cross-disciplinary design firm in Boston, MA).

Tibbits has appeared on numerous television and documentary episodes, including BBC Click, Fox Business Network, This Old House and BBC World News Live. His work has been featured in various print and media outlets including New York Times, Wired, CNN, the Smithsonian Institution and Fast Company.

Awards 
Tibbits' work has won awards including a 2014 WIRED Inaugural Fellowship, 2014 Gifted Citizen Initiative, the 2013 Architectural League NYC Prize, 2013 Next Idea in Art and Technology Award at Ars Electronica, 2012 TED Senior Fellowship, 2011 TED Fellowship and named a “Revolutionary Mind” in SEED Magazines 2008 Design Issue.

Publications 
 Tibbits, S. (2012), "Design to Self-Assembly." Architectural Design, 82: 68–73. doi: 10.1002/ad.1381
 Dan Raviv, Wei Zhao, Carrie McKnelly, Athina Papadopoulou, Achuta Kadambi, Boxin Shi, Shai Hirsch, Daniel Dikovsky, Michael Zyracki, Carlos Olguin, Ramesh Raskar & Skylar Tibbits (2014), “Active Printed Materials for Complex Self-Evolving Deformations,” Scientific Reports, 4, 7422 doi:10.1038/srep07422
 Kara'in, L., Schaeffer, J., de Puig, H., Gomez-Marquez, J., Young, A. and Tibbits, S. (2014), “DNA disPLAY: Programmable Bioactive Materials Using CNC Patterning,” Architectural Design, 84: 104–111. doi: 10.1002/ad.1788
Tibbits, S. (2014), “4D Printing: Multi-Material Shape Change,” Architectural Design, 84: 116–121. doi: 10.1002/ad.1710
Tibbits, S. and Cheung, K. (2012) "Programmable materials for architectural assembly and automation", Assembly Automation, Vol. 32 Iss: 3, pp. 216 - 225

References

External links
 MIT Self-Assembly Lab
 SJET

American architects
American designers
Living people
Massachusetts Institute of Technology alumni
MIT School of Architecture and Planning faculty
Year of birth missing (living people)